Lake Hazar  is a rift lake in the Taurus Mountains, 22 km southeast of Elazığ, notable as the source of the Tigris. It was formerly known as Lake Geoljuk.

During the Armenian genocide the lake was used as an execution site.

Sunken city 

Scientists found 4,000-year-old archaeological traces of a city below the lake. The city has been submerged in Lake Hazar, since 1830. Turkey wants to register its historic 'Sunken City' in eastern Anatolia as a UNESCO World Heritage Site.

Ebubakar Irmak, Mayor of Sivrice, said he dove into the lake last year and saw the remains of churches, walls of a castle, pots, pottery and glazed plates of the citadel with traces of the Seljuk, Byzantine and Ottoman era. In 2019, amphora tombs were also found in the sunken city.

References

Hazar
Landforms of Elazığ Province